The 1914 All-Ireland Junior Hurling Championship was the third staging of the All-Ireland Junior Championship since its establishment by the Gaelic Athletic Association in 1912.

Tipperary entered the championship as the defending champions.

The All-Ireland final was played on 18 October 1914 at Croke Park in Dublin, between Clare and Laois, in what was their first ever championship meeting. Clare won the match by 6–05 to 1–01 to claim their first championship title.

Results

All-Ireland Junior Hurling Championship

All-Ireland final

References

Junior
All-Ireland Junior Hurling Championship